The National Library of Angola is located in Luanda.

Notes

See also 
 List of libraries in Angola
 Arquivo Histórico Nacional (Angola)
 List of national libraries

References

Bibliography
  (Includes information about the national library)

External links 
 National Library of Angola

Angola
Libraries in Angola
Buildings and structures in Luanda
Libraries established in 1969